Trilbyana or Trilby-Mania was the fashion for things based on the story Trilby by George du Maurier.  This was especially popular during the 1890s.  The works included burlesques, cartoons, movies, parodies, plays, sketches and tableaux.

References

Mania
Literary fandom
19th-century fashion
Trilby (novel)